Lizo Mjempu (born 1 January 1984 in Queenstown) is a South African professional footballer who played as a defender for Moroka Swallows.

Career 
Lizo Mjempu began his professional career in the South African Premier Soccer League playing for Mpumalanga Black Aces, followed by Jomo Cosmos and Lusitano F.C. before signing with Ajax Cape Town as a free transfer in the summer of 2010. His last club was Moroka Swallows until 2015.

In 2020 he became manager of Passion FC.

References

1984 births
Living people
People from Queenstown, South Africa
Soccer players from the Eastern Cape
Xhosa people
South African soccer players
Cape Town Spurs F.C. players
Orlando Pirates F.C. players
Association football defenders
Jomo Cosmos F.C. players
Moroka Swallows F.C. players
Lusitano F.C. (South Africa) players